Laird v. Tatum, 408 U.S. 1 (1972), was a case in which the United States Supreme Court dismissed for lack of ripeness a claim in which the plaintiff accused the U.S. Army of alleged unlawful "surveillance of lawful citizen political activity."  The appellant's specific nature of the harm caused by the surveillance was that it chilled the First Amendment rights of all citizens and undermined that right to express political dissent.

Background

Arlo Tatum, the executive secretary of the Central Committee for Conscientious Objectors, sued Melvin Laird, the Secretary of Defense. Tatum sued after Washington Monthly published an article revealing that US military intelligence units were gathering intelligence on civilians and civil organizations in the US.

Opinion
The Court was initially divided into three camps.  Justices Rehnquist and Powell initially urged the conservatives to determine that the surveillance program was constitutional.  However, Chief Justice Burger, and Justices Blackmun and White determined that it would be more controversial for the Court to enter into a political question."  After further reflection Powell concluded that it was unwise to rule on the constitutionality of the surveillance program and that the issue was best decided on the principle of ripeness.  That is, in the absence of a discernable injury, the issue was too speculative for the Court to rule upon.  Burger eventually prevailed on Rehnquist to abandon a concurrence and join with the majority.

The Court determined that the plaintiff's claim was based on the fear that sometime in the future the Army might cause harm with information retrieved during their surveillance, but that there was no present threat. Therefore, the claim was too "speculative."

Mr. Justice Douglas wrote in dissent, with Mr. Justice Marshall concurring:

Participation by Justice Rehnquist
The dismissal of the case was made possible by the timely nomination by Richard Nixon of Assistant Attorney General William Rehnquist to the Supreme Court. Rehnquist had previously testified to Senator Sam Ervin's committee that there were no "serious constitutional problems with respect to collecting data or keeping under surveillance persons who are merely exercising their right of a peaceful assembly or petition to redress a grievance." He further stated that he felt that Laird v. Tatum should be dismissed on the procedural ground that the plaintiffs lacked standing to sue. Yet he later refused to recuse himself from the case as legal ethicists almost unanimously agreed that he should. After a petition for rehearing was filed based on his participation, Rehnquist issued a memorandum stating that the attack on his impartiality was essentially a criticism of his conservative judicial philosophy, and there had been no actual bias towards the litigant.

See also
List of United States Supreme Court cases, volume 408
Surveillance-related
Amnesty v. Blair
Clapper v. Amnesty International
COINTELPRO
Fusion center
PRISM (surveillance program)
Recusal-related
appearance of impropriety
conflict of interest

References

Further reading

External links

United States Constitution Article Three case law
United States Supreme Court cases
United States Supreme Court cases of the Burger Court
1972 in United States case law
United States privacy case law
United States ripeness case law
Opposition to United States involvement in the Vietnam War
Conscientious objection